My Cat Yugoslavia is the first novel by Pajtim Statovci. The novel explores the lives of a woman in Kosovo and of her son as a refugee in Finland. The book was first published in Finnish in 2014 and in English in 2017. It received the 2014 Helsingin Sanomat Literature Prize. It was made into a play and staged at the Finnish National Theater in Helsinki in 2018.

References 

2014 novels
Novels set in Kosovo
Novels set in Finland
21st-century Finnish novels
Books about cats
Novels about immigration
Magic realism novels
2014 debut novels